Computer-assisted reviewing (CAR) tools are pieces of software based on text-comparison and analysis algorithms. These tools focus on the differences between two documents, taking into account each document's typeface through an intelligent analysis.

Detecting differences
The intelligent analysis used by CAR tools detect the differences do not have the same value depending on their type and/or the document field/subject. For example, a difference on a number is not the same if this number is a date, a price, a page number, a figure number, a part of an address, a footnote call, a list item number, a title number, etc.
 a title number or a list item number difference can be of no interest if these numbers will be re-calculated afterward before printing or publishing by a text processing tool,
 a small number difference like "1" to "one" or "1" to "1st" is often of secondary interest, depending on the subject and the field of the document
 while some other number differences can be very damageable to the document.

These tools are interesting in various kind of applications:
 comparison between a document and an updated/modified version of it. The main goal is then to highlight the modifications made by a third person or a text processing software.
 comparison between a document edited two file formats: Word, TXT, PDF, HTML, XML. The main goal is to highlight differences implied by the format modification or the conversion/re-formatter software. Often, simple char encoding conversion troubles can cause disasters.

For translation
Computer assisted reviewing for translation (CART) tools are CAR tools being able to manage multi-lingual comparisons. This implies to be able to match each part of text from one document to the other, taking into account the specificity of each language: date/number formats, punctuation (for example,  French/English quotation marks), etc. The best CART tools are able to find matches between noun or verbal groups, this implying to find terminological and syntactical elements using linguistic analyzers.

Application examples 
 A book author updating his document (often in Word format) while he is receiving printer's proofs (often in PDF), or translations in another language.
 A web site content manager that should ensure updates and versions consistence of his HTML pages in different languages
 A printer that should ensure the consistency and the quality of his process, possibly using proprietary XML/SGML formats, some automatic treatments, possible manual interventions, done by himself or by a subcontractor.
 An editor through which documents from all actors are transiting
 The MediaWiki "history" on each page is a CAR tool

See also 
 Computer-assisted translation
 Language industry
 Translation memory

External links
 CoquiWeb (still experimental CAR & CART tool).

Word processors
Reviewing